The Administrative Building of Rostov (Warsaw) University is a building in Rostov-on-Don constructed in 1897. Initially it formed a part of the  building complex. From 1915 it housed the Medical Faculty of the University of Warsaw, which had been evacuated to Rostov-on-Don during the First World War. It currently houses the administration of Rostov State Medical University and has the status of an object of cultural heritage of Russia of regional significance.

History and description 
The building's architect was supposedly . The two-story building is constructed of brick and has a pitched metal roof. The facades are not plastered. The main facade is situated on Nakhichevan Pereulok. On the sides there are two rizalites with attics. The tiered division of the facade is emphasized by belt courses. The walls are rusticed; the window openings of the first and second floors have different shapes: they are decorated with pediments, platbands and keystones. The windows of the lateral risalites at the second floor are decorated with twin pilasters with archivolts and with an arcuate cornice. Overall the building has a complex configuration.

Memorial plaque 
In 1984, a memorial plaque with the following inscription was installed on the building:

References

Literature 
 Панков Г. И. Кузница медицинских кадров. Очерки истории Ростовского медицинского института. — Ростов-на-Дону, 1968. — С. 3—13, 15, 43, 71.
Buildings and structures in Rostov-on-Don
Government buildings completed in 1897
Tourist attractions in Rostov-on-Don
Education in Rostov-on-Don
Cultural heritage monuments in Rostov-on-Don
Cultural heritage monuments of regional significance in Rostov Oblast